John Renwick may refer to:

 John Renwick (Doc Savage), a Doc Savage character
 John Renwick (field hockey) (1921–2009), American field hockey player